Biotodoma cupido, commonly known as the green-streaked eartheater or cupid cichlid, is a species of cichlid native to the Amazon and Essequibo basins in Bolivia, Brazil, Colombia, Guayana, and Peru. It is sometimes seen in the aquarium trade. It was originally described in 1840 as Geophas cupido.

References 

cupido
Fish of South America
Fish described in 1840
Taxa named by Johann Jakob Heckel